The 1995 Louisville Cardinals football team represented the University of Louisville in the 1995 NCAA Division I-A football season. The Cardinals, led by first-year head coach Ron Cooper, participated as independents and played their home games at Cardinal Stadium.

Schedule

References

Louisville
Louisville Cardinals football seasons
Louisville Cardinals football